Arrancy is a commune in the department of Aisne in the Hauts-de-France region of northern France.

Geography
Arrancy is located some 15 km southeast of Laon and 40 km northwest of Reims.  It can be accessed by the D1044 road from Festieux in the north which passes down the eastern edge of the commune and continues south to Corbeny. The village is accessed by the D88 which runs west from the D1044 to the village then continues west to Ployart-et-Vaurseine. There are also some country roads which access the commune. The commune is mixed farmland and forest with no other hamlets or villages other than Arrancy.

La Bièvre stream rises northeast of the village and flows southwest to the south of the village then west into the Ailette Lake.

Neighbouring communes and villages

Administration

List of Successive Mayors of Arrancy

Population

Culture and heritage

Civil heritage
The commune has two buildings and structures that are registered as historical monuments:
The Chateau of Arrancy (17th century) is registered as an historical monument.
The old Chateau of Arranceau (15th century) is registered as an historical monument.

Religious heritage

The Church of Saint-Rémi contains many items that are registered as historical objects:
A Statue (16th century)
A Statue: Saint Barbe (16th century)
A Tombstone of Charles Duglas, his wife, and their children (1703)
A Tombstone of Louis de Proisy and Louise de Gris, his wife (1628)
A Tombstone of Philippe Duglas (1614)
A Tombstone of Jacques de Proisy, Baron of La Bove, and Claudine d'Espena, his wife (1561)

Notable people linked to the commune
Thomas-Antoine-Jean Maussion, French politician, Mayor of Arrancy, died there in 1839.
Lieutenant-Colonel René de La Tour du Pin, Marquis of La Charce, was born on 1 April 1834 in Arrancy.

See also
Communes of the Aisne department

References

External links

Arrancy on the old IGN website 
Bell Towers website 
40000 bell towers website 
Arrancy on Géoportail, National Geographic Institute (IGN) website 
Arancy on the 1750 Cassini Map

Communes of Aisne